Market in Banska Bystrica (in Slovak: Trh v Banskej Bystrici) is an 1889 painting by the Slovak artist Dominik Skutecký.

Description
The picture is painted with oil paints and measures 83.3 × 113.5 cm. It is part of the collection of the Slovak National Gallery in Bratislava.

Analysis
This is the most famous painting by Dominik Skutecký. The attitude of the artist's painting is formed mainly under the influence of Italian art. He lived in Venice 1879–1889, with few interruptions. What he learned in Italy is well-expressed in this painting. The picture depicts a market in Budapest. Extremely important in this work is the light that radiates optimism, good atmosphere and mood. After 1900, he painted the market in Banska Bystrica again, but the later painting has more spots and shadows.

References

1889 paintings
Paintings in Slovakia
Oil on canvas paintings
Slovak art
Culture in Budapest
History of Budapest
Retail markets in Hungary